Symphony of Sinners & Saints is a concept studio album by American orchestral composer, songwriter, pianist/keyboardist, and music producer Kitt Wakeley. The album peaked at #1 on Billboard's Classical Crossover and Classical charts and at #18 on Hot Hard Rock Songs.It was recorded at Abbey Road Studios in London, UK and released on May 21, 2021, by Studio Seven Media record label. The album was recorded with an orchestra, several choirs, and a rock band, with elements of Rock, EDM, Classical, and Symphonic Rock.  Feature guest appearances include Joe Satriani, Andy Timmons, the Royal Philharmonic Orchestra, the London Voices, and the Dallas Gospel of Light Choir, among others.

The album was supported by three singles, "Conflicted", "Sinners & Saints", and "Forgive Me", which all charted at #1 on Billboard's Hard Rock Digital Sales. It won Album of the Year at the Josie Music Awards and "You Gave Me Wings" won Best Instrumental Song at the 2021 Hollywood Music in Media Awards.Wakeley charted in the "Top 10" of 2021's Year-End Classical Crossover Albums Artists.

Background

History
Symphony of Sinners & Saints was conceived when the COVID-19 pandemic resulted in the cancellation of Wakeley's live shows for 2020.  Having an abundance of time away from touring led to the album's creation, production, and guest list. In an interview with American Songwriter magazine, Wakeley shared, "There’s a really dark, sinister underlying bed, but then there’s this euphoric stuff over it. That’s the concept of the album."

It was initially recorded at Abbey Road Studios in London, UK, then co-produced, engineered, and mixed by Tre Nagella at Luminous Sound Studios in Dallas, Texas.  Due to the pandemic Wakeley recorded remotely from Oklahoma City, Oklahoma tapping into the musicians in London in real time to work on each song.

The album was supported by three singles, "Conflicted", "Sinners & Saints", and "Forgive Me", which all peaked at #1 on Billboard's Hard Rock Digital Sales.  Wakeley charted in the "Top 10" of 2021's Year-End Classical Crossover Albums Artists. Symphony of Sinners & Saints won "Album of the Year" at the Josie Music Awards and "You Gave Me Wings" won "Best Instrumental Song" at the 2021 Hollywood Music in Media Awards.

To promote the release of the album Wakeley performed at Carnegie Hall, and the Civic Center Music Hall in Oklahoma City, among other venues.

Joe Satriani collaboration
Joe Satriani played lead guitar on tracks, Conflicted and Forgive Me.  When asked about working with Satriani, Wakeley replied, "I emailed very well known artists of Joe's caliber on their respective instruments. Joe being so gracious opened up a whole lot more doors of other artists who wanted to play on my project."

Album reviews
The album received favorable reviews from music critics upon its release:

"The larger-than-life track showcases rock-driven guitar shredding alongside precise and sprawling orchestration, making for a uniquely powerful hybrid of chamber music, heavy metal and rock, and film score." - Glide Magazine

"The album is great on first listen, but repeated plays reveal more and more layers and the listener will find him/herself drawn further in and finding new things to hear with each listen. A stunning piece of creative artistry!" - Andy Hawes, Metal Planet Music

Billboard charts

Track listing

Personnel

Musicians

 Piano and Synthesizer - Kitt Wakeley
 Guitar - Andy Timmons 
 Guitar - Paige Harwell 
 Guitar - Joe Satriani 
 Guitar - João Miguel 
 Guitar - Daniel Uribe 
 Guitar - Felipe Sanchez 
 Bass - Ryan Miller 
 Drums - Brent Berry 
 Orchestra - Royal Philharmonic Orchestra 
 Orchestration - Kitt Wakeley 
 Conductor - Cliff Masterson 
 Choir - London Voices

Technical

 Producers - Kitt Wakeley and Tre Nagella
 Recording engineer - Lewis Jones
 Mixing engineer - Tre Nagella
 Mastering engineer - Kevin Lively
 Recording studio - Abbey Road Studios, London, UK
 Mixing studio - Luminous Studios - Dallas, Texas
 Mastering studio - Lively Mastering - Oklahoma City, Oklahoma

Additional personnel

 Graphic artist - Kitt Wakeley
 Photography - Teresa Jolie

External links
 Kitt Wakeley

References

2021 albums
Symphonic rock albums
Classical crossover albums
Concept albums